Bote Ridle Nzuzi Baku (born Bote Nzuzi Baku; 8 April 1998) is a German professional footballer who plays as a right-back or midfielder for Bundesliga club VfL Wolfsburg and the Germany national team.

Club career

Mainz 05
In the 2017–18 season, Baku joined the squad of Mainz 05 II, making his debut in the Regionalliga Südwest on 30 July 2017 in a 3–0 home win against FSV Frankfurt. Baku scored his first goal for the reserve team on 16 September 2017, scoring Mainz's second in the 82nd minute of the 2–0 home win against Kickers Offenbach.

Baku made his professional debut for Mainz 05 in the 2017–18 DFB-Pokal on 19 December 2017, starting in the 3–1 home win against VfB Stuttgart. He made his Bundesliga debut on 29 April 2018 in the 3–0 home win against RB Leipzig. Baku secured the victory for Mainz, scoring the final goal of the match in the 90th minute.

VfL Wolfsburg

2020–21 season
On 1 October 2020, Baku completed a move to fellow Bundesliga side VfL Wolfsburg, for an undisclosed fee on a five-year contract. He made his club debut three days later in a 0–0 draw with Augsburg, replacing Renato Steffen who had tested positive for COVID-19. He scored his first goal for the club in a 1–1 draw with Hertha Berlin on 1 November.

Baku impressed in his first season at the club and was named to the Bundesliga Team of the Season. He contributed with a league-leading 2583 intensive runs after 31 matchdays, including an also league-leading 993 sprints, over 150 more than the second name on that particular list. He scored six goals and supplied a further four assists to go with 82 crosses, 32 shots, and 305 successful tackles.

2021–22 season
Baku scored in Wolfsburg's opening match of the 2021–22 season on 8 August 2021, a 3–1 win over fourth division club SC Preußen Münster in the first round of the DFB-Pokal. However, Wolfsburg used a total of six substitutes, while only five were allowed, and were disqualified after a protest by Preußen Münster. Baku scored again two weeks later in a come-from-behind league win over Hertha Berlin.

International career
Baku earned his first call-up for the German senior team on 8 November 2020. His debut came on 11 November 2020, in a friendly game against the Czech Republic. On 6 June 2021, he won the UEFA Under-21 Euro 2021 with the Germany U21, giving the assist to the solitary goal against Portugal.

Style of play
Baku has been described as an energetic right full-back who can both inflict damage going forward while possessing the defensive nous to hold things together defensively when on the back foot.

Personal life
Born Bote Nzuzi Baku on 8 April 1998 in Mainz, Germany, Baku is of Congolese descent. He is the twin brother of Makana Baku, who is also a professional footballer. He was given the nickname "Ridle" by his father, who was a fan of German footballer Karl-Heinz Riedle. In 2018, Baku had his name legally changed to include Ridle.

Career statistics

Club

International

As of match played 14 November 2021
Germany score listed first, score column indicates score after each Baku goal

Honours
Germany U21
UEFA European Under-21 Championship: 2021

Individual
UEFA European Under-21 Championship Team of the Tournament: 2021
Bundesliga Team of the Season: 2020–21

References

External links

Profile at the VfL Wolfsburg website

1998 births
Living people
Sportspeople from Mainz
Footballers from Rhineland-Palatinate
German footballers
Association football midfielders
1. FSV Mainz 05 II players
1. FSV Mainz 05 players
VfL Wolfsburg players
Regionalliga players
Bundesliga players
Germany youth international footballers
Germany under-21 international footballers
Germany international footballers
German sportspeople of Democratic Republic of the Congo descent